Doctor in Clover is a British comedy film released in 1966, starring Leslie Phillips.  The film is based on the novel of the same title by Richard Gordon. It is the sixth of the seven films in the Doctor series.

The film was released in the US as Carnaby, MD. British singer Kiki Dee sang the film's title track.

Synopsis
The film is based at the (fictitious) St Swithin's Hospital, with Leslie Phillips as Dr Gaston Grimsdyke, an accident-prone doctor and cad, more interested in the nurses than the patients.

Grimsdyke is sacked from his job as a medical officer at a men's prison, for his misbehaviour with the Governor's daughter, so he enrolls in a refresher course with his old medical tutor Sir Lancelot Spratt (James Robertson Justice), who is determined to make him a successful surgeon.

Grimsdyke discovers that a plum senior medical post is shortly to become vacant, and starts scheming to be considered, instead of his cousin, who has already been unofficially offered the job.

Spratt and the newly appointed hospital matron clash, leading Spratt to 'volunteer' Grimsdyke to romance her and 'soften her up'. But she mistakenly believes Spratt to be her admirer, and many funny and inevitable complications ensue.

Grimsdyke falls in love with the much younger Physiotherapist Jeanine (Elizabeth Ercy) but she considers him to be too old for her. Grimsdyke tries various hilarious methods to make himself look younger and more appealing to Jeanine without success. Eventually he declares his love to her. Her reply to him is that he is very sweet but she says that she has just become engaged to be married to Lambert Symington (Jeremy Lloyd).

At a hospital dance, a 'rejuvenation serum' which Grimsdyke has accidentally injected into Sir Lancelot causes the latter to run amok at the party and romance the new matron. She decides to resign and a new matron is appointed. But she turns out to be equally opposed to Spratt's ideas of how the hospital should be run.

When Grimsdyke is told that he was not successful in getting the plum senior medical post, instead of his cousin, because he is considered to be too young looking, this lifts his mood
and the film ends.

Main cast

Leslie Phillips as Dr Gaston Grimsdyke
James Robertson Justice as Sir Lancelot Spratt
Shirley Anne Field as Nurse Bancroft
John Fraser as Dr Miles Grimsdyke    
Joan Sims as Matron Sweet
Arthur Haynes as Tarquin Wendover
Fenella Fielding as Tatiana Rubikov
Jeremy Lloyd as Lambert Symington
Noel Purcell as O'Malley
Robert Hutton as Rock Stewart
Eric Barker as Professor Halfbeck
Norman Vaughan as TV Commentator
Terry Scott as Robert the hairdresser
Elizabeth Ercy as Jeanine the Physiopherapist
Alfie Bass as Fleming
Anne Cunningham as Women's Ward Sister
Suzan Farmer as Nurse Holliday
Harry Fowler as Grafton
Peter Gilmore as the Choreographer
Bill Kerr as Digger
Robin Hunter as Sydney
Nicky Henson as Salesman
Justine Lord as New Matron
Alexandra Bastedo as Nurse at Party
Lionel Murton as Publicity Man
Ronnie Stevens as TV Producer
Danny Green as Ashby (uncredited)
Andre Maranne as Pierre in French Movie (uncredited)
Wendy Richard as Nurse (with false eyelashes) (uncredited)
Jack Smethurst as Long-haired Patient (uncredited)

Production
The novel Doctor in Clover was published in 1960. Film rights were bought by the Rank Organisation, whose head of production Earl St John announced the film for production in 1961. However, it took a number of years for the film to be made. The film was formally announced in 1964, one of a series of comedies that Rank were making at the time (others including Carry On Cleo and That Riviera Touch).

The film was shot in Carnaby Street, Wormwood Scrubs and Pinewood Studios.

The opening credits include the following acknowledgement: We are grateful for the help and facilities given at Wexham Park Hospital by the staff of the Hospital, Humphreys Ltd. and The Windsor Group Hospital Management Committee.

While the film was shown at its full 101 minutes duration in most other countries, the British Board of Film Classification ordered that the UK cinema version had to be cut down to 97 minutes in order to get an "A" (adult) classification, and that duration has remained in later British video releases.

Reception
The film opened in London on 4 March 1966, with general release following on 3 April.

Critical
"The title alone will go a long way towards selling this picture", noted Graham Clarke in Kinematograph Weekly, "and it backs this with a good ration of knockabout fun."

Box office
The film was among the 15 top money-makers at the British box-office that year.

References

External links

Doctor in Clover at Britmovie
Doctor in Clover at BFI

1966 films
1966 comedy films
British comedy films
Doctor in the House
1960s English-language films
Films directed by Ralph Thomas
Films scored by John Scott (composer)
Films shot in England
Films set in hospitals
Films shot at Pinewood Studios
Films produced by Betty Box
1960s British films